"Let Me Be the One" was the 's entry in the Eurovision Song Contest 1975, written by Paul Curtis and performed in English by the band The Shadows.

The song was performed ninth that night. At the close of voting, it had received 138 points, placing it 2nd out of 19.

Charts

Personnel (studio recording)
Hank Marvin – guitar and vocals
Bruce Welch - guitar and lead vocals
Brian Bennett – drums
John Farrar – piano and vocals
Alan Tarney – bass guitar
John Fiddy  – String arrangements

Personnel (live)
Hank Marvin – guitar and vocals
Bruce Welch - bass and lead vocals
Brian Bennett – drums
John Farrar – guitar and vocals
Alan Tarney – piano (concert appearance)

References

Eurovision songs of the United Kingdom
Eurovision songs of 1975
1975 songs
EMI Records singles
The Shadows songs
Songs written by Paul Curtis (musician)